Saqqezchi may refer to:
 Saqqezchi, Namin, Ardabil Province
 Saqqezchi, Nir, Ardabil Province
 Saqqezchi, East Azerbaijan